Adair–Casey Community School District is a public school district headquartered in Guthrie Center, Iowa.

The district serves both Adair and Casey, and the surrounding rural areas. Most of the district is in Adair and Guthrie counties, with smaller portions in Audubon County.

It has entered into a "grade-sharing" relationship with Guthrie Center Community School District in which it sends its high school students to the Guthrie Center school.

Schools
Schools in Adair include:
 Adair–Casey Elementary School
 AC/GC Junior High School

Under grade-sharing, students attend AC/GC High School in Guthrie Center.

References

External links
 Adair-Casey Community School District and Guthrie Center Community School District

See also
List of school districts in Iowa

School districts in Iowa
Education in Adair County, Iowa
Education in Audubon County, Iowa
Education in Guthrie County, Iowa